McDowell Run is a tributary of Bull Creek in Allegheny and Butler counties in the U.S. state of Pennsylvania.

Course

McDowell Run joins Bull Creek near the intersection of Bull Creek and Howes Run roads in Fawn Township.

See also 

 List of rivers of Pennsylvania
 List of tributaries of the Allegheny River

References

External links

U.S. Geological Survey: PA stream gaging stations

Rivers of Pennsylvania
Tributaries of the Allegheny River
Rivers of Allegheny County, Pennsylvania
Rivers of Butler County, Pennsylvania